FIVB Club World Championship may refer to
 FIVB Volleyball Men's Club World Championship
 FIVB Volleyball Women's Club World Championship